is a railway station in Itoda, Fukuoka Prefecture, Japan. It is on the Itoda Line, operated by the Heisei Chikuhō Railway. Trains arrive roughly every hour.

It was renamed in 1943 with the purchase of the entire Itoda Line by Japanese Government Railways.

References

Railway stations in Fukuoka Prefecture
Railway stations in Japan opened in 1897
Heisei Chikuhō Railway Itoda Line